Probable G-protein coupled receptor 146 is a protein that in humans is encoded by the GPR146 gene. It has been identified as a possible receptor for C-peptide.

References

Further reading 

 
 

G protein-coupled receptors